Marinus Bernardus Rost van Tonningen (October 24, 1852 in Paramaribo – January 7, 1927 in The Hague) was a major general in the Dutch Army and the Royal Dutch East Indies Army.

He is known for having commanded the Dutch intervention in Bali (1906) and the Dutch intervention in Bali (1908).

He was the father of Meinoud Rost van Tonningen.

Awards and decorations
 Knight of the Order of the Netherlands Lion
 Honorary Sabre
 Expedition Cross with the clasp "Aceh 1873–1880"
 Lombok Cross

Notes

References
Willard A. Hanna 2004 Bali Chronicles Periplus 

1852 births
1927 deaths
People from Paramaribo
Royal Netherlands Army personnel
Royal Netherlands East Indies Army officers
Knights of the Order of the Netherlands Lion
History of Bali